The Second Battle of Mesilla was an unusual engagement of the American Civil War. It was fought on July 1, 1862, and was the last engagement between Union and Confederate forces in the Arizona Territory.  A skirmish outside of Confederate Arizona's capital of Mesilla between a confederate party and local pro-Union New Mexican guerrillas resisting the Confederate foraging expedition, resulted in a United States victory. Various accounts report from seven to twelve Confederates killed, including their commander Capt. Cleaver of the 7th Texas Infantry and as many as 40 of the local guerrillas.

The arrival of the advance party of the California Column on the west bank of the Rio Grande on July 4, 1862, prompted the rebel army to begin withdrawal to Franklin and then San Antonio three days later, covered by Herbert's Battalion of Arizona Cavalry acting as rearguard.

References

 Martin Hardwick Hall, The Confederate Army of New Mexico, Austin, Texas: Presidial Press, 1978, pp. 363
 L. Boyd Finch, Confederate Pathway to the Pacific: Major Sherod Hunter and Arizona Territory, C.S.A., Tucson, Arizona: Arizona Historical Society, 1996, pp. 164–66
 William S. Kiser,Turmoil on the Rio Grande: History of the Mesilla Valley, 1846–1865, Texas A&M University Press, 2011, pp. 187–88

External links
 The Confederate Arizona Campaign of 1862, Col. Sherrod Hunter Camp 1525, SCV, Phoenix, Arizona.

19th-century military history of the United States
History of Doña Ana County, New Mexico
Battles of the Trans-Mississippi Theater of the American Civil War
Battles and conflicts without fatalities
Butterfield Overland Mail
Battles of the American Civil War in Arizona
Battles of the American Civil War in New Mexico
1862 in New Mexico Territory
July 1862 events